

Tournaments

Men's tournaments

Olympics
1904 Summer Olympics at St. Louis, featured basketball as a demonstration sport.
Champion: Buffalo German YMCA
Collegiate champion: Hiram College, in the first basketball tournament ever held limited exclusively to college teams
High school champion: New York
Elementary school champion: New York

References